Robert Strawbridge (born 1732 - died 1781) was a Methodist preacher born in Drumsna, County Leitrim, Ireland.

Early life and ancestral history 

Information detailing the early life of Robert Strawbridge is somewhat limited. One article, Robert Strawbridge, offers some light unto the subject. Another source, Robert Strawbridge: Some Additional Irish Perspectives offers additional details.

In the year 1732, Robert Strawbridge was born in a small farming town in the county of Leitrim, Ireland. The town of Gortconnellan, Drumsna situates on a ridge. The town's name literally means "the ridge over the swimming place."  It is here along the south-eastern flow of the majestic River Shannon, makes a series of turns which create a perfect loop before regaining its original course. The result of the back-tracking waterway is a protected area blessed with the country's most fertile and wooded lands.  It is these abundant lands which Robert grows up. The farm with a privileged view of the river will house Robert until his 24th birthday. Crimmins (1905) calls him a native of the nearby Carrick on Shannon, County Leitrim. 
 
The land which the Strawbridge family lives on is a gift to an ancestor one-hundred and fifty years before, when the English King James transplanted English families in the hopes of gaining strategic lands along the bountiful River Shannon. To the Catholic citizens of Ireland, this transplanting of Englishmen by the Anglican King was tantamount to military and religious conquest.  Despite the native opposition, the transplanting occurs, creating a line of natural-resource- abundant towns along the Shannon. The town of Drumsna is one of these new settlements.

Robert's Anglican household, in a gesture to disgruntled Irish neighbors, names him after his maternal grandfather.  According to JR Wesley Weir in his article,  Robert Strawbridge: Some Additional Irish Perspectives, "the long-held Irish tradition is to name the oldest son after the paternal grandfather and the next son after the maternal grandfather." From this, it is easy to surmise that Robert is the second son born to his parents.

Gaining the benefits of a proper education, Robert easily improves to a bright young man, eloquent in speech, intelligent and from a somewhat affluent family.  Robert is also a physically strong fellow, his trade as a carpenter embellishing his sturdy frame which tops out at just less than 6’ tall.  The man with shoulder length hair that frames brilliant eyes and a handsome face has a winsome and gentle smile that warms the hearts of many, notwithstanding one particular young lady he eventually marries.

For Robert in the summer of 1758, the warmer months marked a two-year spiritual journey.  Since 1756, when he experienced his Christian conversion, Robert went on a preaching tour. His conversion experience was unconventional, mentored by one brought up in a traditional Irish-Catholic family. The unlikely mentor was Laurence Coughlan.

Coughlan's family is more in line with the traditional Irishmen of the 18th century, real Hibernians.  He too was born in Drumsna, but unlike Robert Strawbridge, Coughlan did not experience the benefits of education like Robert. Despite this limited beginning, Coughlan finds himself drawn and changed by the words of the Bible. His exposure to the sacred texts comes by through the efforts of John Wesley's itinerants in the year 1753.  His birth anew moves him to vigorously gain knowledge of the word. These efforts create a deep urge for him to preach to the inhabitants of Drumsna. John Wesley, hearing of the young man's efforts recruits him just two years later. Another twelve months later and Coughlan departs Ireland of his own doing to preach to the fishermen of Newfoundland.

Before Coughlan departs for Newfoundland, his early preaching efforts in Drumsna convert the younger brother of Robert Strawbridge, Leonard.  The transformation of the younger brother also influences Robert Strawbridge. Upon his conversion, Robert's "all in" approach to life leads him to abandon his trade and begin preaching.

It isn't long before his independent spirit invites opposition. His Anglican experience, much like Coughlan's Catholic experience, inspires Robert to alienate himself from the institutionalized religion of the Anglican Church. The first signs of trouble occur only months after his initial efforts to preach. The controversy arises by his efforts to go against John Wesley's admonition that no Methodist preachers are to distribute the sacraments without being ordained by the Anglican Church. Wesley was not seeking a separation from the Anglican Church. He did all he could to instill confidence that his Methodist efforts were mainly a revival movement within the Anglican Church. In Ireland, the independent spirit of several of the early Irish Methodist preachers thought otherwise.

Robert's zeal for reaching the lost souls of Leitrim County led him to go against John Wesley's rules and distribute communion and baptize new converts. Robert was determined to bring the entire Christian experience to each person he met.

This distribution of the sacraments by the Irish preachers was not a new thing beginning with Robert Strawbridge.  Years before, many of the new preachers in Ireland had themselves licensed under the Toleration Act of 1689.  This provision from the English King inspired men like Thomas Walsh and the brothers Charles and Edward Perronet to on their own, distributing the Lord's Supper and Baptism.
Despite those who preceded Robert, the Anglican and Wesleyan faithful in Drumsna ask him to leave only a few months after his initial efforts.  Unshaken by this, Robert gathers his horse and heads out on a preaching tour. His stops in the neighboring counties of Sligo and Kilmore, eventually end in the County of Armagh, specifically the town of Terryhoogan. In Terryhoogan he meet his future wife. They marry shortly before 1760. Also in 1760, Robert and his wife consider as many other young Irish couples; they contemplate leaving Ireland for America.

See also
 Philip Embury

References

Primary sources

Secondary sources

External links
 
 The Asbury Triptych Series: Book series about Francis Asbury, Robert Strawbridge is a key character in this series. See article, Robert Strawbridgehttp://www.francisasburytriptych.com/book-series/characters/robert-strawbridge/ on book series' website.

American Methodists
Burials at Mount Olivet Cemetery (Baltimore)
People from County Leitrim
Irish Methodists
1781 deaths
Year of birth unknown
Irish emigrants to the United States (before 1923)